The men's discus throw event at the 2017 Summer Universiade was held on 26 and 28 August at the Taipei Municipal Stadium.

Medalists

Results

Qualification
Qualification: 60.00 m (Q) or at least 12 best (q) qualified for the final.

Final

References

Discus throw
2017